Corymbia dunlopiana, commonly known as Dunlop's bloodwood, bongonyin, or Oenpelli bloodwood is a species of tree that is endemic to the Northern Territory. It has rough bark on the trunk and branches, a crown of sessile, juvenile leaves arranged in opposite pairs, flower buds solitary or in groups of three, red flowers and urn-shaped fruit.

Description
The bark is rough, tessellated or flaky and grey-brown over reddish-brown. The branchlets, leaves and flower-buds are all rough and hairy. The leaves are the same shade of dull, yellow-green, light green to grey-green on both sides. Flowering has been observed in most months but mostly from the end of the dry season to early in the wet season.

Taxonomy and naming
Corymbia dunlopiana was first formally described in 1995 by Ken Hill and Lawrie Johnson from specimens collected near Pine Creek in 1985. The specific epithet (dunlopiana) honours Clyde R. Dunlop, a Northern Territory botanist. "Bongonyin" is the name given to the species in the Wagiman language.

Distribution and habitat
The range of C. dunlopiana extends from west of Katherine to the Daly River and as far east as near Jim Jim in open savannah woodland. It prefers rising ground, outcrops and ridges usually with skeletal soils and often forms pure stands of small, twisted, shrubby individuals.

See also
 List of Corymbia species

References

dunlopiana
Myrtales of Australia
Flora of the Northern Territory
Plants described in 1995